The 1st Artillery Regiment is a regiment of artillery in the French Army tracing its modern history to 1791 when the Régiment de La Fére was re-organised into the 1st Artillery Regiment after the French Revolution.

History 
 It was raised as the Régiment de la Fère in 1765, from the 1st battalion of the Régiment Royal-Artillerie. In 1791, after the French Revolution, it had the title of its aristocratic patron removed and was given the number 1, as the seniormost French regiment of artillery. In 1785, Napoleon Bonaparte was commissioned into this regiment as a sous lieutenant. He officially served until 1790, but he spent most of that time on leave in Corsica, where he led a battalion of Republican volunteers.

Current Organisation 
The current organisation of the regiment is:

 Command and Logistics Battery
 1ére Batterie (MLRS M270 and 120 mm mortars)
 2éme Batterie (MLRS M270 and 120 mm mortars)
 3éme Batterie (MLRS M270 and 120 mm mortars)
 4éme Batterie (COBRA counter-battery radars, SL2A acoustic artillery location systems, and GA10 ground alert and impact zone early warning systems)
 5éme Batterie (COBRA counter-battery radars, SL2A acoustic artillery location systems, and GA10 ground alert and impact zone early warning systems)
 6éme Batterie (Reserve)
 Maintenance Battery

References 

Artillery regiments of France

Military units and formations established in 1791